The Khobi or Khobistskali (ხობისწყალი) is a river in Georgia. It flows into the Black Sea through the Colchis Lowland. Khobi town and Chkhorotsqu town are both situated on the banks of the Khobi river. It is used for irrigation in some areas.

The source of water is mainly rain. The mean flow rate (30 km from the mouth) is 44.2 m3/s, maximum 333m3/s. The main tributary of the Khobi is the Chanistskali.

During the Great Patriotic War there was a temporary base of the Black Sea Fleet.

In 2000-2005 an oil depot for tankers was built in the village of Kulevi, near the mouth of the Khobi.

See also
 Geography of Georgia (country)

References

Rivers of Georgia (country)
Tributaries of the Black Sea